The TR postcode area, also known as the Truro postcode area, is a group of 27 postcode districts in South West England, within 15 post towns. These cover west Cornwall, including Truro, Penzance, Camborne, Falmouth, Hayle, Helston, Marazion, Newquay, Penryn, Perranporth, Redruth, St Agnes, St Columb and St Ives, plus the Isles of Scilly.



Coverage
The approximate coverage of the postcode districts:

|-
! TR1
| TRURO
| Truro
| Cornwall Council
|-
! TR2
| TRURO
| Gerrans, Probus, St Mawes, Tregony, Truro, Veryan, West Portholland
| Cornwall Council
|-
! TR3
| TRURO
| Truro, Perranwell Station, Feock, Playing Place, Ponsanooth
| Cornwall Council
|-
! TR4
| TRURO
| Blackwater, Frogpool, Goonhavern, Trispen
| Cornwall Council
|-
! TR5
| ST. AGNES
| St Agnes, Mithian
| Cornwall Council
|-
! TR6
| PERRANPORTH
| Perranporth, Bolingey, Perrancoombe
| Cornwall Council
|-
! TR7
| NEWQUAY
| Newquay
| Cornwall Council
|-
! TR8
| NEWQUAY
| Carland Cross, Mitchell, Quintrell Downs
| Cornwall Council
|-
! TR9
| ST. COLUMB
| St Columb Major
| Cornwall Council
|-
! TR10
| PENRYN
| Penryn
| Cornwall Council
|-
! TR11
| FALMOUTH
| Falmouth, Flushing, Mylor Bridge, Constantine, Mawnan Smith
| Cornwall Council
|-
! TR12
| HELSTON
| Helston, Mullion
| Cornwall Council
|-
! TR13
| HELSTON
| Helston
| Cornwall Council
|-
! TR14
| CAMBORNE
| Camborne
| Cornwall Council
|-
! TR15
| REDRUTH
| Redruth, Pool
| Cornwall Council
|-
! TR16
| REDRUTH
| Lanner, Carharrack, Gwennap, St Day, Portreath
| Cornwall Council
|-
! TR17
| MARAZION
| Marazion
| Cornwall Council
|-
! TR18
| PENZANCE
| Penzance
| Cornwall Council
|-
! TR19
| PENZANCE
| Pendeen, St Buryan
| Cornwall Council
|-
! TR20
| PENZANCE
| Ludgvan, Penzance, Praa Sands
| Cornwall Council
|-
! TR21
| ISLES OF SCILLY
| St Mary's, Hugh Town
| Council of the Isles of Scilly
|-
! TR22
| ISLES OF SCILLY
| St Agnes
| Council of the Isles of Scilly
|-
! TR23
| ISLES OF SCILLY
| Bryher
| Council of the Isles of Scilly
|-
! TR24
| ISLES OF SCILLY
| Tresco
| Council of the Isles of Scilly
|-
! TR25
| ISLES OF SCILLY
| St Martin's
| Council of the Isles of Scilly
|-
! TR26
| ST. IVES
| St Ives, Zennor
| Cornwall Council
|-
! TR27
| HAYLE
| Hayle
| Cornwall Council
|}
The TR25 postcode district covers the smallest population in the UK.

Map

See also
Postcode Address File
List of postcode areas in the United Kingdom
Extreme points of the United Kingdom

References

External links
 Royal Mail's Postcode Address File
A quick introduction to Royal Mail's Postcode Address File (PAF)

Postcode areas covering South West England
Cornwall-related lists